Port Richmond is an unincorporated community in King William County, Virginia, United States.  It lies on the Pamunkey River within the town limits of West Point, northwest of the town center and adjacent to Euclid Heights.

References

Unincorporated communities in Virginia
Unincorporated communities in King William County, Virginia